The Divine Incantations Scripture is the oldest known Chinese classic text that details an apocalypse.

History 
The earliest portions of the book have been traced back to the beginning of the fifth century CE, with subsequent commentary attesting an origin in the early fourth; the book likely integrates older traditions.

These traditions offered a new route to transcendence that was different from the Way of the Celestial Masters from which it branched. The Divine Incantations Scripture sought to clarify the gods are "merely the officials of the celestial bureaucracy". The text was unique for the time in that it promised the aid of celestial "ghost troops" to those who upheld its teachings and acknowledged the dynamic obedience and simultaneous danger of various "daemon kings" that also existed in a fantastical version of the metaphysical world. These characteristics draw interesting parallels with the cosmic and celestial warfare depicted in the Book of Revelation from the Christian New Testament canon. The book also urges Daoists to "assiduously convert the unenlightened", and demands scriptural exclusivity when receiving the Divine Incantations Scripture.

Notes

References

Works cited 

 
 

Taoist texts
Apocalyptic literature